The Smugglers is the completely missing first serial of the fourth season in the British science fiction television series Doctor Who, which was first broadcast in four weekly parts from 10 September to 1 October 1966.

In this serial, the Doctor (William Hartnell) and his new travelling companions Ben (Michael Craze) and Polly (Anneke Wills) arrive on the coast of seventeenth-century Cornwall – much to the astonishment of Polly and Ben. Pirates led by Captain Samuel Pike (Michael Godfrey) and his henchman Cherub (George A. Cooper) are searching for a hidden treasure, while a smuggling ring masterminded by the local squire Edwards (Paul Whitsun-Jones) is trying to off-load contraband. Although audio recordings, still photographs, and clips of the story exist, no episodes of this serial are known to have survived.

The serial is currently set to be reconstructed via animation as part of Doctor Who's 60th anniversary.

Plot

The First Doctor's new companions Ben and Polly arrive with him in the TARDIS on the coast of seventeenth century Cornwall. They meet a worried churchwarden named Joseph Longfoot, who lives in fear of "Avery's boys" and, in thanks for the Doctor's kindness in relocating a dislocated finger, imparts a cryptic message he calls "Deadman's secret key": "Smallbeer, Ringwood, Gurney". While the time travellers head off to the local inn, Longfoot has another visitor. This is Cherub, Longfoot's former shipmate under pirate Captain Avery on the Black Albatross. Cherub and his master, Samuel Pike, who captains the Albatross since Avery died, want to recover Avery's accursed gold. Pike is convinced that Longfoot has the treasure or knows where it is hidden. When the churchwarden does not co-operate, Cherub kills him – but not before revealing he saw the three travellers who visited Longfoot earlier.

The discovery of the churchwarden's body leads the locals to suspect the three strangers at the inn. The local Squire is called to intervene and adjudicate, and charges Ben and Polly with the murder. Employing trickery to obtain their freedom, they split up. Ben hides at the church until Josiah Blake, a revenue man tracking the local smugglers, disturbs him.

In the meantime, Cherub and some pirates have kidnapped the Doctor and taken him to the Albatross. The Doctor attempts to bargain with Pike, and is kept aboard ship while the captain goes ashore. Pike decides to try to make an alliance with the Squire as well to protect himself while he searches for Avery's treasure. The greedy Squire is the organiser of the local smuggling ring and offers to cut Pike and his pirates in. They are interrupted by Polly, who has come to implore the Squire to help her find the Doctor and is shocked to see him in the company of the kidnapping pirate Cherub.

Pike, Cherub and the Squire bind and gag Polly and take her to the church, meeting and capturing Ben on the way. They attempt to convince Blake that Ben and Polly are the true smugglers. Knowing the truth but lacking the manpower to arrest the pirates, Blake pretends to arrest Ben and Polly. Meanwhile, the Doctor has escaped and meets up with his friends in the churchyard. Blake works out a smuggling drop is due soon and heads off for more revenue men to break the smuggling ring.

The smuggling alliance has by now fallen apart: the Squire has realised he is dealing with a ruthless pirate who will not honour any bargains with him while Cherub has decided to locate Avery's gold for himself. The Squire sets off to find the gold, as do the time travellers since the Doctor is convinced the rhyme of the churchwarden is the key. He works out the names Ringwood, Smallbeer, and Gurney pertain to graves in the crypt but before he can find the treasure, the other seekers arrive. Cherub wounds the Squire, and forces the Doctor to confess the rhyme. Cherub concludes that Deadman too is a name of one of Avery's former pirates, but is slain by a vengeful Pike, who now threatens to pillage the entire village in his search for Avery's treasure. The Doctor bargains with Pike for the lives of the villagers if he shows him the treasure and, with this agreed, they find the gold at the intersection of the four graves.

No sooner does Pike have the treasure than Blake and an armed patrol of revenue men arrive. Aided by the injured Squire – who repents of his sins – Blake kills Pike, and the pirate force is routed. As the battle dies down, the Doctor and his companions slip away to the TARDIS, and the Doctor says superstition is a strange thing but it sometimes tells the truth.

Production

 Episode is missing

All four episodes of this serial are considered missing. Due to the story's unusual amount of violence for the time, it was heavily censored; pieces of Australian censor footage survive, mainly depicting the piratical villains.

This was the last story filmed in the third season's production block, although it was held over until the beginning of the fourth season. During filming, the production team realized that William Hartnell's health had deteriorated beyond the point where he could continue to work.  Many months' discussion about replacing Hartnell finally came to a head, and Innes Lloyd decided not to renew Hartnell's contract. It is unclear whether Hartnell was contractually obliged to appear in The Tenth Planet or whether he agreed to do so after being informed of Lloyd's decision.

This was the first story to feature major location shooting. All previous location shots had been conducted at locations around London, but substantial portions of this story were filmed in Cornwall.

On initial airing, this story posted the lowest audience figures since the show began, at an average of 4.48 million viewers per episode. It would remain the least-watched Doctor Who serial for twenty years, until The Trial of a Time Lord: The Mysterious Planet aired in 1986.

Reception 
In 2002, Interzones Paul Beardsley reviewed the CD release as "an amiable but unremarkable purely historical yarn set in 17th century Cornwall" but remarked "[Anneke Wills]'s very good, and I hope she'll return to do The Underwater Menace."

In a review for the Radio Times, Patrick Mulkern praised the "excellent cast", though noting that the character of Jamaica was "a dodgy caricature that would be inconceivable in modern drama."  Mulkern was also impressed by the authentic Cornwall locations, "a terrific bonus that allows the production to breathe."

Commercial releases

In print

A novelisation of this serial, written by Terrance Dicks, was published by Target Books in June 1988.

Home media
The soundtrack for the story exists due to fan-made recordings. These have been released on CD together with linking narration provided by cast member Anneke Wills. Several brief clips cut by Australian censors for violence were recovered in 1996 and were released on the Lost in Time DVD box set in 2004. Also included in the set is amateur on-location colour film footage made during production at Trethewey Farm, Trethewey, Cornwall.

Notes

References

External links

1966 British television episodes
Doctor Who historical serials
Doctor Who missing episodes
Doctor Who serials novelised by Terrance Dicks
Doctor Who serials written by Brian Hayles
First Doctor serials
Television episodes set in the 17th century
Television episodes set in England